Franz Adam Karrer (1666 – 1740) was a Swiss officer, brigadier in French service, and founder and first colonel-proprietor of the Swiss regiment de Karrer on 15 Dec 1719. He became a Knight of the Order of Saint Louis in 1709.

Military career
Karrer became officer cadet in an independent company in French service in 1686 and was commissioned as an ensign in the Swiss regiment von Salis-Soglio in French service in 1691. From there he became a lieutenant in 1693, and captain-lieutenant in 1698. Also in 1698, he became commanding officer of a half-company, eventually becoming proprietor of a half-company 1709 and captain of grenadiers 1710. Karrer entered a capitulation with the King of France on 15 Dec 1719, raising a regiment of foot for French service, the Régiment de Karrer,  becoming colonel in 1720, and brigadier in 1734. In 1736 he transferred the proprietorship of the regiment to his son Ludwig Ignaz Karrer.

Personal life
Karrer was born in Landser, Haut-Rhin, Alsace on 22 Nov 1666.  He was married to Johanna Marguerite de Voile before 1703, the daughter of a bailiff (chief court official) in Alsace. He died 3 May 1740 in Rochefort, Charente-Maritime, Poitou-Charentes, France.

References

Further reading
 B.F. de Zurlauben (1751). Histoire militaire des Suisses au service de la France 3. pp. 112-115, 502-505 
 E. May (1788). Histoire militaire de la Suisse et celle des Suisses dans les différens services de l'Europe 6. pp. 280 f. 
 P. Wirz (1862). Bürgergeschlechter der Stadt Solothurn 11, Ms., 1862, 59 (Kopie StASO) 
 M. Rochat (1994). Geflammte Ordonnanzfahnen der ständigen Schweizer Linienregimenter in franz. Diensten von 1672 bis 1792. pp. 182-186 

1672 births
1741 deaths
People from Solothurn
French military personnel of the War of the Spanish Succession
French military personnel of the War of the Austrian Succession
Swiss mercenaries
Knights of the Order of Saint Louis